USS Rafael Peralta (DDG-115) is an -class guided missile destroyer in the United States Navy. The destroyer can operate with a Carrier Strike Group (CSG), Expeditionary Strike Group (ESG), as an element of a Surface Action Group (SAG), or independently. The ship can conduct a variety of missions in support of national military strategy. From peacetime presence and crisis management to sea control and power projection, 115 will be capable of carrying out Integrated Air and Missile Defense (IAMD), Undersea Warfare (USW), Surface Warfare (SW), and Strike Warfare (STW) in multi-threat environments.

The $679.6 million contract to build her was awarded on 26 September 2011 to Bath Iron Works of Bath, Maine. On 15 February 2012, Secretary of the Navy Ray Mabus announced the ship's named to be Rafael Peralta in honor of Marine Rafael Peralta, who was petitioned for the Medal of Honor for shielding several Marines from a grenade in November 2004 during the Iraq War; however, he was posthumously awarded the Navy Cross instead, after doubts regarding the exact sequence of events prior to his death were raised.

Namesake
Rafael Peralta was born in Mexico City and immigrated to the United States as a child. Peralta joined the United States Marine Corps when he received his green card in 2000 and became a U.S. citizen while serving in the Marine Corps. Peralta was killed during the Second Battle of Fallujah in Iraq when he was wounded by small arms fire while clearing houses with his fellow Marines. The insurgents threw a hand grenade into the room. Despite being injured, Peralta pulled the grenade underneath his body (thus absorbing most of the blast), killing him instantly and saving his fellow Marines. For his actions, Peralta was recommended for the Medal of Honor but was posthumously awarded the Navy Cross instead.

Design
Rafael Peralta is the 65th ship of the Arleigh Burke class of destroyers, the first of which, was commissioned in July 1991. With 75 ships planned to be built in total, the class has the longest production run for any U.S. Navy surface combatant warship. As an Arleigh Burke-class ship, Rafael Peraltas roles will include anti-aircraft, anti-submarine, and anti-surface warfare, as well as strike operations. During its long production run, the class was built in three flights—Flight I (DDG-51 to DDG-76), Flight II (DDG-72 to DDG-78), and Flight IIA (DDG-79 onward). Rafael Peralta is a Flight IIA ship, and as such, features several improvements in terms of ballistic missile defense, an embarked air wing, and the inclusion of mine-detecting ability.

Construction and career
By January 2014, the aft portion of the ship had been completed and had begun outfitting and she was laid down on 30 October 2014.

The ship was christened on 31 October 2015 at Bath Iron Works. In February 2017, the ship was accepted by the United States Navy.

Rafael Peralta was commissioned in San Diego, California on 29 July 2017 and was homeported at Naval Base San Diego before moving to Japan in 2021.

The Arleigh Burke-class guided-missile destroyers Rafael Peralta and  arrived in Sasebo for a port visit on 8 February 2020.

Deployments
 17 January 2020 - 3 September 2020 - 5th/7th fleet - Maiden deployment

In Popular Culture
Rafael Peralta was used in the Amazon Prime Video series Tom Clancy's Jack Ryan, season 2 episode 8 in November 2019.

Gallery

References

Further reading
"Destroyers To Be Named After Hawaii War Heroes" (15 February 2012), KITV News, Hearst Stations Inc.
"Navy names two ships for Marines" (15 February 2012), JD News, Freedom Communications, Inc.
"Navy: 3 new ships to be named after war heroes" (15 February 2012), The Washington Times

External links

 
 

 

Arleigh Burke-class destroyers
2015 ships